Slovenia participated in the Eurovision Song Contest 2021 with the song "Amen" written by Ana Soklič, Bojan Simončič, Žiga Pirnat and Charlie Mason. The song was performed by Ana Soklič, who was internally selected by Slovenian broadcaster  to represent Slovenia at the 2021 contest in Rotterdam, Netherlands, after she was due to compete in the 2020 contest with "" before the 2020 event's cancellation. Ana Soklič was announced at the Slovenian representative on 16 May 2020, while the song, "Amen", was presented to the public on 27 February 2021 during the special show .

Slovenia was drawn to compete in the first semi-final of the Eurovision Song Contest which took place on 18 May 2021. Performing during the show in position 2, "Amen" was not announced among the top 10 entries of the first semi-final and therefore did not qualify to compete in the final. It was later revealed that Slovenia placed thirteenth out of the 16 participating countries in the semi-final with 44 points.

Background 

Slovenia's highest placing in the contest, to this point, has been seventh place, which the nation achieved on two occasions: in 1995 with the song "" performed by Darja Švajger and in 2001 with the song "Energy" performed by Nuša Derenda. The country's only other top ten result was achieved in 1997 when Tanja Ribič performing "" placed tenth. Since the introduction of semi-finals to the format of the contest in 2004, Slovenia had thus far only managed to qualify to the final on six occasions. In 2019, "" performed by Zala Kralj and Gašper Šantl qualified to the final and placed fifteenth.

The Slovenian national broadcaster, broadcasts the event within Slovenia and organises the selection process for the nation's entry.  confirmed Slovenia's participation in the 2021 Eurovision Song Contest on 16 May 2020. The Slovenian entry for the Eurovision Song Contest has traditionally been selected through a national final entitled  (EMA), which has been produced with variable formats. For 2021, the broadcaster opted to forego the use of this national final in order to internally select the Slovenian entry; the last time a Slovenian entry was selected internally was in 2013.

Before Eurovision

Internal selection 

On 16 May 2020,  confirmed that Ana Soklič would remain as Slovenia's representative for the Eurovision Song Contest 2021. Following the announcement of Soklič as the selected artist, composers were able to submit their songs to the broadcaster between 13 July 2020 and 30 September 2020. 191 songs were received by the broadcaster during the submission period. An expert committee consisting of Ana Soklič, Darja Švajger (singer, vocal coach and 1995 and 1999 Slovenian Eurovision entrant) and Vladimir Graić (composer of Serbia's winning Eurovision entry "Molitva" in 2007) shortlisted three songs from the received submissions, with the Slovenian entry being determined by an alternate committee consisting of Darja Švajger, Mojca Menart (Head of the publishing business of ) and Matevž Šalehar (musician and singer-songwriter) from the three shortlisted songs.

The selected song, entitled "Amen", was presented during the special show  which took place on 27 February 2021 at the  Studio 1 in Ljubljana, hosted by Nejc Šmit and former Slovenian Eurovision contestant Lea Sirk who represented Slovenia in 2018. The 2021 edition of EMA simultaneously celebrated Slovenia's 60th anniversary since their first appearance in the Eurovision Song Contest (including Slovenia's appearances as part of Yugoslavia). The song was written by Bojan Simončič, Žiga Pirnat, Charlie Mason and Ana Soklič herself. Mason had previously co-written the Eurovision Song Contest 2014 winning entry "Rise Like a Phoenix".

At Eurovision 

According to Eurovision rules, all nations with the exceptions of the host country and the "Big Five" (France, Germany, Italy, Spain and the United Kingdom) are required to qualify from one of two semi-finals in order to compete in the final; the top ten countries from each semi-final progress to the final. The European Broadcasting Union (EBU) split up the competing countries into six different pots based on voting patterns from previous contests, with countries with favourable voting histories put into the same pot. The semi-final allocation draw held for the Eurovision Song Contest 2020 on 28 January 2020 was used for the 2021 contest, which Slovenia was placed into the first semi-final, which was held on 18 May 2021, and was scheduled to perform in the first half of the show.

Once all the competing songs for the 2021 contest had been released, the running order for the semi-finals was decided by the shows' producers rather than through another draw, so that similar songs were not placed next to each other. Slovenia was set to perform in position 2, following the entry from Lithuania and before the entry from Russia.

In Slovenia, the semi-finals were televised on RTV SLO2 and the final was televised on RTV SLO1 with commentary by Mojca Mavec. The contest was also broadcast via radio with all three shows airing on Radio Val 202. The Slovenian spokesperson, who announced the top 12-point score awarded by the Slovenian jury during the final, was Lorella Flego.

Semi-final 

Ana Soklič took part in technical rehearsals on 8 and 12 May, followed by dress rehearsals on 17 and 18 May. This included the jury show on 17 May where the professional juries of each country watched and voted on the competing entries.

The Slovenian performance featured Ana Soklič performing on stage in a white pant-suit with a floor-length shoulder cape. Soklič was in the middle of the stage at the beginning of the song but later walked towards the satellite stage during the second chorus. The stage colours were gold and the LED screens transitioned from a black hole to glitter and sun and the earth in gold. Ana Soklič was joined by an off-stage backing vocalist: Karin Zemljič.

At the end of the show, Slovenia was not announced among the top 10 entries in the first semi-final and therefore failed to qualify to compete in the final. It was later revealed that Slovenia placed thirteenth in the semi-final, receiving a total of 44 points: 8 points from the televoting and 36 points from the juries.

Voting 

Below is a breakdown of points awarded to Slovenia in the first semi-final, as well as by the country in the final. Voting during the three shows involved each country awarding two sets of points from 1-8, 10 and 12: one from their professional jury and the other from televoting. The exact composition of the professional jury, and the results of each country's jury and televoting were released after the final; the individual results from each jury member were also released in an anonymised form. Slovenia's jury consisted of Bojan Cvjetićanin, Nuša Derenda, Amaya, and Raay. In the first semi-final, Slovenia placed 13th with a total of 44 points, thus failing to qualify for the final. The performance received 8 televoting points, while the jury points added to 36, including 7 from Romania. Over the course of the contest, Slovenia awarded its 12 points to Cyprus (jury) and Croatia (televote) in the first semi-final, and to Italy (jury) and Serbia (televote) in the final.

Points awarded to Slovenia

Points awarded by Slovenia

Detailed voting results 
The following members comprised the Slovene jury:
 Bojan Cvjetićanin – singer, member of Joker Out, represented Slovenia in the Eurovision Song Contest 2023
 Nuša Derenda – singer-songwriter, represented Slovenia in the Eurovision Song Contest 2001
  – songwriter, composer of the Slovenian entries to Eurovision in 1998, 2001 and 2006
 Maja Keuc (Amaya) – singer-songwriter, represented Slovenia in the Eurovision Song Contest 2011
 Aleš Vovk (Raay) – songwriter, represented Slovenia in the Eurovision Song Contest 2015 as a member of Maraaya, composer of the Slovenian Eurovision entry in 2014 and junior entries in 2014 and 2015

References 

2021
Countries in the Eurovision Song Contest 2021
Eurovision